Notoleptopus is a monotypic genus of flowering plants in the family Phyllanthaceae. It is one of eight genera in the tribe Poranthereae. The sole species is Notoleptopus decaisnei. It is a monoecious shrub, native to Australia, New Guinea, and Indonesia.

Notoleptopus decaisnei had long been treated as a species of Leptopus, but in 2007, a molecular phylogenetic study of DNA sequences found it to be sister to a clade consisting of Pseudophyllanthus and Poranthera. In 2008, the new genus Notoleptopus was created for it.

The species, N. decaisnei, has eleven synonyms, and was first described as Andrachne decaisnei by George Bentham in 1873. The species epithet honours Joseph Decaisne.

 Andrachne decaisnei Benth.
 Andrachne decaisnei var. orbicularis Benth.
 Andrachne fruticosa Decne. ex Müll.Arg.
 Andrachne fruticosa var. orbicularis (Benth.) Pax & K.Hoffm.
 Andrachne orbicularis (Benth.) Domin
 Arachne decaisnei (Benth.) Pojark.
 Arachne fruticosa Hurus.
 Arachne orbicularis (Benth.) Pojark.
 Leptopus decaisnei (Benth.) Pojark.
 Leptopus decaisnei var. orbicularis (Benth.) Airy Shaw
 Leptopus orbicularis (Benth.) Pojark.

Description
Bentham describes the species Andrachne Decaisnei as follows:In Australia, it is found in Western Australia, the Northern Territory and Queensland. In Queensland, under the Nature Conservation Act 1992, it is declared a species of "least concern".

References

External links
 Images & occurrence data from GBIF

Phyllanthaceae
Monotypic Malpighiales genera
Flora of Australia
Flora of New Guinea
Flora of Java
Flora of the Lesser Sunda Islands
Phyllanthaceae genera